Alexander Khlebnikov (1897-1979) was a Soviet photographer. He painted still lives.

References

1897 births
1979 deaths
Soviet photographers